St Bees is a civil parish in the Borough of Copeland, Cumbria, England.  It contains 38 buildings that are recorded in the National Heritage List for England.  Of these, four are listed at Grade I, the highest of the three grades, two are at Grade II*, the middle grade, and the others are at Grade II, the lowest grade.  The parish includes the village of St Bees and the surrounding coastline and countryside.  In the 12th century a Benedictine priory was established in the parish.  Most of this disappeared after the Dissolution of the Monasteries apart from the priory church, most of which became the Church of St Mary and St Bega, the parish church of the village, while most of the chancel was modified for other uses.  Also in the village is St Bees School, an independent school.  The church, the school, and a number of associated structures are listed.  Most of the other listed buildings are houses and associated structures, and farmhouses and farm buildings.  The other listed buildings include a bridge, a signal box, and two war memorials.

Key

Buildings

Notes and references

Notes

Citations

Sources

Lists of listed buildings in Cumbria
Listed buildings